Sri Ramakrishna College of Arts and Science (Formerly SNR Sons College - An Autonomous Institution) is a College of Arts and Science in Coimbatore, Tamil Nadu, India. It was founded in 1987. At present, with 5000+ students, the college is offering 30+ programmes in Arts, Humanities, Science, Commerce and Management domains. The college of Accredited by NAAC with A+ grade. The college was ranked 84th among colleges by NIRF 2021.

History 

Sri Ramakrishna College of Arts and Science (Formerly SNR Sons College), Coimbatore, India  was started in 1987 by Sevaratna Dr. R. Venkatesalu of the SNR Sons Charitable Trust. The college is situated at the heart of the Coimbatore city and has a beautiful scenic campus sprawling over an area of 16 acres with numerous imposing buildings. The college is autonomous (since 2004) in its third cycle and  affiliated to Bharathiar University since 1987. It is re-accredited (fourth cycle) with 'A+' Grade by NAAC (National Accreditation and Assessment Council) and an ISO 9001: 2015 certified institution.

The college was selected as one of the cleanest college in India by Swachhta Ranking of MHRD, Government of India, 2019. ASSOCHAM awarded the college as one among 'Best Private Arts & Science College in India'. Under the college category in the NIRF 2021 (Ministry of Education, Government of India) the college secured 84th Rank. The college is placed in Band C (Rank Above 50) by Atal Ranking of Institutions on Innovation Achievements (ARIIA 2020) - an initiative of Ministry of Human Resource Development (MHRD), Govt. of India. The Week magazine ranked the college as 'Top 50 Best Arts & Science College in India'. Careers360 ranked the college as "AAA+".It owns the SNR College Cricket stadium in which TNPL 2022 was conducted in Coimbatore, India.

Courses 
The institute offers 24 undergraduate courses and 11 postgraduate courses apart from Research programs.

Undergraduate Courses

Management
 BBA
 BBA Computer Application

Commerce
 BCom
 BCom Accounting & Finance
 BCom Banking & Insurance
 BCom Computer Application
 BCom Professional Accounting
 BCom Business Process services (integrated with TCS)
 BCom Corporate Secretaryship
 BCom International Business
 BCom Information Technology

Computer Science
 BSc Computer Science
 BSc Computer System and Cognitive Systems
 BSc Information Technology
 BCA Computer Applications

Science
 BSc Electronics Science
 BSc Physics
 BSc Chemistry
 BSc Mathematics
 BSc Catering Science & Hotel Management
 BSc BioTechnology
 BSc Mathematics with Computer Applications

Humanities
 BA English Literature

Post Graduate Courses

 MBA (Full Time- AICTE approved)
 MSc CS
 MSc IT
 MSc Mathematics
 MSc ECS
 MSc VLSI
 MSW
 MIB
 MCom FCA
 MSc Bio Tech
 MA English Lit

Research programs

 Electronics
 Computer Science 
 Commerce 
 Management Science
 Mathematics
 English
 Tamil

Certificate / Diploma / Advanced Diploma Courses

 35 courses related to all the discipline

Facilities

 Sports and Games
 Training and Placement  
 Add-on Courses 
 Value Added Programmes
 Hostels 
 Digital Library
 Internet LAB 
 Fine Art and Culture 
 NSS, NCC, YRC, RRC
 Tamil Mandram  
 English Literary Club
 Eco (Green) Club
 Programming Club
 Rotaract
 Online Courses 
 Coaching for Bank Exams 
 Coaching for Government Exams
 Outbound  Training
 Online Learning
 Online Assessment
 Management Information System
 Learning Management System

Campus Life 
Scenario is the Inter-Departmental Fest organized by the students of Sri Ramakrishna College of Arts & Science. It also comprises 30+ Clubs which includes Rotaract Club, NCC, Uyir Club, etc for various activities to encourage students and enrich their skills.

Principal

Dr B L Shivakumar, Principal & Secretary

Notable Alumini 

 Narayan Jagadeesan, Cricketer, Chennai Super Kings
 Hari Nishanth, Cricketer, Chennai Super Kings

See also 
 Sri Ramakrishna Engineering College 
 Sri Ramakrishna Institute of Technology 
 Sri Ramakrishna College of Arts and Science for Women
 Sri Ramakrishna Hospital

References

Universities and colleges in Coimbatore
Educational institutions established in 1987
1987 establishments in Tamil Nadu